The 2016 Europe's Strongest Man was a strongman competition that took place in Leeds, England on the 9th July 2016 at the First Direct Arena. This event was part of the 2016 Giants live tour.

Results of events

Event 1: Max Deadlift
Notes: A number of athletes were invited to take part in this event only and therefore they did not score points.

Event 2: Frame Carry
Weight:  
Course Length:  

^ Marius Lalas sustained an injury in this event and took no further part in the competition.

^ Stefan Solvi Petursson sustained an injury in this event and took no further part in the competition.

Event 3: Log Lift
Weight:  for as many repetitions as possible.
Time Limit: 75 seconds

Event 4: Car Walk
Weight:  
Course Length:

Event 5: Atlas Stones

Final Results

References

External links 

Competitions in the United Kingdom
Europe's Strongest Man